Tables Will Turn: Unsigned Band Compilation #8 is a compilation album that is the 8th in the Unsigned Band Compilation series released by Velvet Blue Music.

Track listing

Disc 1

 "Fly West" - Electric Kaleidescope
 "Past You" - Dorian Vasquez
 "Rooster" - The Broadway Hush
 "Maniacs Collide" - Blankethead
 "Pilgrim" - Joel Willoughby
 "Wherever You Go" - Love Poets
 "Pilots Last Broadcast" - Hundred Year Storm
 "Live Without Me" - Milton & the Devils Party
 "Defending Your Life" - Bridge Work Device
 "Fountains" - Michael Goodin
 "Zebra" - The Tea Club
 "Fruit of the Poisonous Tree" - Patron Saint
 "Unveiled" - The Methods

Disc 2

 "Some Things in Life" - David Morgan
 "Scars and Stitches" - Sparrows Gate
 "Short Cuts" - Radio Carolyn
 "Now She's Got a Kid" - Nathan McCullough
 "I Once Was There" - The Alexander
 "PJ" - Januar
 "Thirty-four Hours" - Scripted Failures
 "Napoleon" - Ethan and Benjamin
 "Forgotten Requiem" - Farewell Aurora
 "Was It Murder" - The Brandon Cole Catastrophe
 "The Sun and Thievery" - Husband and Wife
 "Girl from Livermore" - Ill Lucid Onset

External links
 Velvet Blue Music official site
 Velvet Blue Music at MySpace

2006 compilation albums